An anvil is a tool used by metalworkers such as blacksmiths.

Anvil or The Anvil may also refer to:

Anatomy
 Anvil (bone), bone in the ear

Business
 Anvil Mining, copper producing corporation
 Anvil Knitwear, century-old brand acquired by Gildan Activewear

Media & entertainment
 North Carolina Anvil, alternative weekly newspaper
 The Anvil (magazine), American political magazine of the 1930s
 Anvil the Rhino, Ace Lightning character
 Anvil (game engine), video game engine

Medicine
 Anvil (insecticide), used against mosquitoes carrying West Nile Virus
 Anvil (pesticide), used against fleas and ticks

Music
 The Anvil (album), by British pop band Visage (1982), includes the eponymous song
 Anvil (band), heavy metal band
 Anvil! The Story of Anvil, documentary about the band (2008)

Persons
 Jim "The Anvil" Neidhart (1955-2018), wrestler
 Christopher Anvil (1925–2009), pseudonym of writer Harry C. Crosby

Places
 Anvil City, former name of Nome, Alaska
 Anvil, Michigan, unincorporated community, United States
 Anvil, Ohio, unincorporated community, United States
 Anvil, Oklahoma, ghost town, United States
 Anvil Island, British Columbia, Canada
 The Anvil, Basingstoke, theatre and concert hall in Basingstoke, England
 The Anvil (gay club) (1974–86), in New York City

Other
 ANVIL, term for CAD software encompassing ANVIL EXPRESS, ANVIL-5000 and ANVIL-1000MD
 Anvil cloud or anvil dome, part of many cumulonimbus clouds
 Anvil, part of the military tactic hammer and anvil
 Part of a stapler
 El Yunque (organization) (Spanish for The Anvil), Mexican secret society
 Anvil, a Python platform for developing web applications

See also
 Operation Anvil (disambiguation)
 Anwil, municipality in Sissach, Switzerland
 Anavil